João Alexandre Oliveira Nunes Henriques (born 31 October 1972) is a Portuguese professional football manager.

Without having played football competitively, he started coaching in the lower leagues before joining second-tier Leixões in 2017. He has managed five clubs in the Primeira Liga, most successfully at Santa Clara.

Managerial career
Born in Tomar, Santarém District, Henriques spent his earlier career in the amateur leagues of Portugal. He then worked as assistant manager and in youth academies in Saudi Arabia and the United Arab Emirates. He returned home in July 2015 to take the job at C.D. Fátima, and won the Santarém Football Association's district league in his first season for promotion to the national third tier. He was dismissed on 1 November 2016 with the club fourth after four wins and a draw from seven games.

Henriques was assistant manager to Daniel Kenedy at Leixões S.C. of LigaPro, and succeeded him on 22 August 2017 after only three games of the season. The next day on his professional debut, the club from Matosinhos won by a single goal at home to neighbours FC Porto B; he dedicated the win to Kenedy.

On 12 January 2018, Henriques moved to Primeira Liga club F.C. Paços de Ferreira on an 18-month deal to replace Petit. His first top-flight game was a 2–0 win at C.D. Aves on 21 January. He left on 21 May by mutual accord, after relegation.

On 31 May 2018, Henriques was named the coach of newly promoted C.D. Santa Clara. He led the Azorean club to two consecutive best-ever 10th-place finishes, as well as a record points tally of 43; he left in July 2020 having ensured a third consecutive Primeira Liga season for the first time in their history.

Henriques returned to the Primeira Liga on 13 October 2020 at Vitória de Guimarães, as Tiago Mendes had left after three matches. The following 5 April, after a run of four consecutive defeats for the sixth-placed club, he was dismissed.

On 5 June 2021, Henriques signed with Moreirense F.C. for the upcoming campaign. He left by mutual accord on 1 December, with the team in 16th.

Henriques became C.S. Marítimo's on 8 September 2022, after Vasco Seabra was dismissed with the team bottom after losing all five opening games. With one win from ten, he too was shown the door on 17 December, with the team in second-last and eliminated from both domestic cups.

Managerial statistics

References

External links
 
 
 Sofoot profile
 ForaDeJogo profile

1972 births
Living people
People from Tomar
Sportspeople from Santarém District
Portuguese football managers
Primeira Liga managers
Liga Portugal 2 managers
C.D. Fátima managers
Leixões S.C. managers
F.C. Paços de Ferreira managers
C.D. Santa Clara managers
Vitória S.C. managers
Moreirense F.C. managers
C.S. Marítimo managers